Atzeneta Unió Esportiva is a Spanish football team based in Atzeneta d'Albaida, in the autonomous Valencian Community. Founded in 1975, it plays in Tercera División – Group 6, holding home matches at Campo de Futbol Municipal El Regit, with a capacity of 1,500 seats.

History
Founded in 1975, Atzeneta only played regional football until 2018, when it achieved promotion to Tercera División. The club reached the sixth position in their first campaign, and later appointed former international footballer David Albelda as their coach.

Under Albelda, the club reached their first-ever promotion to Segunda División B on 26 July 2020, after beating CD Alcoyano in the play-offs.

Season to season

1 season in Segunda División B
2 seasons in Tercera División
1 season in Tercera División RFEF

Current squad

References

External links
Fútbol Regional team profile 
La Preferente profile 
Soccerway team profile

Football clubs in the Valencian Community
Association football clubs established in 1975
1975 establishments in Spain
Province of Valencia